Studia Historica Slovenica  is a peer-reviewed academic journal covering the contemporary history. It is published by the Zgodovinsko društvo dr. Franca Kovačiča v Mariboru (Historical Society dr. Franc Kovačič in Maribor), based in Maribor and the editor-in-chief is Darko Friš. The journal was established in 2001.

Journal acts as an "interdisciplinary scientific review in the field of history, ethnology, history of art, archeology, geography and linguistics and at the same time publishes critics and reports about other publications and activities in professions, which it covers".

Abstracting and indexing
The journal is abstracted and indexed in:
Historical Abstracts (EBSCO)
America: History and Life (EBSCO)
Ulrich's Periodicals Directory
Scopus (2002-2003, 2006–2020)

See also 
List of academic journals published in Slovenia
Zgodovinski časopis

References

External links

History journals
Publications established in 2001
Academic journals of Slovenia
Slovene-language journals
Academic journals published in Slovenia